The Arab Dream is a pan-Arab song released in 1998, discussing themes of Arab unity and Pan-Arabism. Often described as an Operetta in the Arab world, the song includes performances by 23 Arab artists.

The song reached wider popularity in 2000 with the start of the Second Intifada, when satellite channels throughout the Arab world aired the operetta's music video as a form of solidarity with Palestinians.

References

1998 songs
Arabic music